Tarzan and the Leopard Men is a novel by American writer Edgar Rice Burroughs, the eighteenth in his series of twenty-four books about the title character Tarzan. It was serialized in The Blue Book Magazine from August 1932 to January 1933. It was published in book form in 1935. Its plot has nothing in common with the 1946 film Tarzan and the Leopard Woman.

Plot
An amnesiac Tarzan and his monkey companion Nkima are taken by an African warrior to be his guardian spirits, and as such come into conflict with the murderous secret society of the Leopard Men, led by Gato Mgungu.

From America, a young woman arrives in the territory in search of a loved one presumed missing, and two young men (also from that country) come in search of ivory.

Sources

External links
 
ERBzine Illustrated Bibliography entry
Edgar Rice Burroughs Summary Project page
Text of the novel at Project Gutenberg Australia

1935 American novels
1935 fantasy novels
Tarzan novels by Edgar Rice Burroughs